The 1996 Kansas City Wiz season was the first in team and MLS history. Played at Arrowhead Stadium in Kansas City, Missouri.The Wizards were at first named the Wiz and played under that name through 1996 before having it changed for the 1997 season. MLS did not allow matches to end in ties in 1996 and thus Shootouts were used to decide draws, the stats that follow do not include shootout goals scored and the teams actually point total in the regular season was 41 even though it is shown below as 51. Shootout win= 1 point, Shootout loss= 0 points.

Squad

Competitions

Major League Soccer

U.S. Open Cup

MLS Cup Playoffs

Squad statistics

Final Statistics

Kits

References

Sporting Kansas City seasons
Kansas City Wiz
Kansas City Wiz